Leppe is a river of North Rhine-Westphalia, Germany. It flows into the Agger in Engelskirchen.

See also
List of rivers of North Rhine-Westphalia
List of rivers in Germany

References

Rivers of North Rhine-Westphalia
Rivers of Germany